is a railway station scheduled to be built at Haneda Airport in Ōta, Tokyo, Japan, by the East Japan Railway Company (JR East).  It is scheduled to open in 2029.

Layout 
The new station is planned to be located underground between and parallel to the domestic terminals (Terminal 1 and Terminal 2), and just north of and perpendicular to the existing Haneda Airport Terminal 1/2 Station on the Keikyu Airport Line. The station will be reached through a 1.9 km shield tunnel underneath the airfield.

Lines
Haneda Airport New Station will be served by the Haneda Airport Access Line. 

Through service is planned to several regional JR lines, including the Utsunomiya Line, Takasaki Line, Joban Line, Saikyo Line, Rinkai Line, and Keiyo Line. Extensions of the Azusa and Kaiji limited express trains from Shinjuku to Haneda are also under consideration.

References

External links
 JR East Haneda Airport Access Line Plan 

Railway stations in Tokyo
Proposed railway stations in Japan
Haneda Airport